Ferial Salhi (born 2 November 1967) is an Algerian fencer. She competed in the women's individual foil event at the 1996 Summer Olympics.

References

External links
 

1967 births
Living people
People from Annaba
Algerian female foil fencers
Olympic fencers of Algeria
Fencers at the 1996 Summer Olympics
21st-century Algerian people